Shrikant Jichkar (Marathi : श्रीकांत जिचकार) (14 September 1954 – 2 June 2004) was an Indian central civil servant and politician.  He obtained 20 university degrees, and was elected the youngest MLA in the country at the age of 26.

Biography
He was born to a Marathi family. His first degrees were in medicine (MBBS and MD from Nagpur), following which he read a Bachelor of Laws, Master of Laws in international law, Master of Business Administration, Doctor of Business Management, Bachelor of Journalism, Doctor of Literature in Sanskrit, along with ten Masters of Arts degrees in public administration, sociology, economics, Sanskrit, history, English literature, philosophy, political science, ancient Indian history, culture & archaeology, and Psychology. Most of his degrees were with First Merit, and he obtained several gold medals for his degrees. Between 1973 and 1990 he wrote 42 university examinations, every summer and every winter. 

In 1978, he stood for the Indian Civil Service examination conducted by Union Public Service Commission, following which he was selected as a central civil servant under the Indian Police Service cadre. He later resigned from the cadre and stood for the civil service exam to become a central civil servant under the Indian Administrative Services cadre in 1980. Four months after joining, he resigned once more to contest his first general election, where he was elected to the Maharashtra Legislative Assembly, becoming the youngest MLA in the country at the age of 26. He later became a minister, at one point holding 14 portfolios.

He was a member of the Maharashtra Legislative Assembly (1980–85), Maharashtra Legislative Council (1986–92) and served as Minister of State, Government of Maharashtra. He was a member of Rajya Sabha, India (1992–98). He founded the Sàndipani school at Nagpur in 1992. He unsuccessfully contested in the 1998 loksabha election from Bhandara-Gondiya (Lok Sabha constituency) and 2004 loksabha election from Ramtek (Lok Sabha constituency), and lost by a small margin of votes.

He died when a truck collided with his car on 2 June 2004 near Kondhali, approximately 60 kilometers from Nagpur. He was accompanied by a relative of his, Shriram Dhawad, who sustained multiple injuries from the accident.

Philanthropy 
He established Sāndipani School, Nagpur in 1993 under the Shrikant Jichkar Foundation. He also contributed to the education and health of unprivileged children through his trust. After his death, his children continue his philanthropic ventures under the banner of Zero Gravity Foundation.

References

1954 births
2004 deaths
Road incident deaths in India
Indian National Congress politicians
Rajya Sabha members from Maharashtra
Maharashtra MLAs 1980–1985
Politicians from Nagpur
Indian amateur radio operators
Rashtrasant Tukadoji Maharaj Nagpur University alumni
Marathi politicians
Accidental deaths in India